"Thinkin' About Ya" is a 1986 song by San Francisco Bay Area-based music group Timex Social Club, from their debut album Vicious Rumors. The song was mixed by Shep Pettibone. It reached a Hot R&B/Hip-Hop Songs peak chart position of 15 in the United States.

The song is best known for its melody that was used in many subsequent songs. The basic melodic hook of the song was used by Timex Social Club producer Jay King in his subsequent band, Club Nouveau in the song “Why You Treat Me So Bad.” The melodic hook in this last song was subsequently sampled several times by other musicians. The original melody came from 1980 single by Stevie Wonder "Master Blaster (Jammin')". Hip-hop duo Luniz interpolated the song on their hit single "I Got 5 on It"; that song was then sampled by Sean 'Puff Daddy' Combs, on his hit single, "Satisfy You". Singer Jennifer Lopez sampled the song for her single "I'm Gonna Be Alright". Also, the song was sampled by rapper Master P for his song "Thinkin' Bout U" from his album MP da Last Don. Also, the vocals/lyrics in “Thinkin' About Ya” were sampled in the song “Everyday” by Adana Twins and the song “Got It Good” by Mi-T feat. Michael Marshall.

References

1986 singles
1986 songs